William Harvey McCreadie (1 October 1942 – 30 September 2008) was a Scottish professional footballer who played as a centre forward.

Career
Starting out at Scottish club Stranraer, McCreadie would move to English Accrington Stanley in 1959.

In 1960 he would move to Luton Town, however he would only make one appearance before moving to Wrexham

He would then move to English non-league club Mossley, where he would score 36 goals in 44 games for the club.

His form at Mossley would earn him a move to Scottish First Division team Hibernian for a fee of £1,000 in 1962. He would only make 9 appearances there however before moving to Altrincham. His time with Altrincham was interrupted by poor behaviour and his contract was cancelled. Following his release, McCreadie retired aged 22.

References

1942 births
2008 deaths
Scottish footballers
Association football forwards
Stranraer F.C. players
Accrington Stanley F.C. players
Luton Town F.C. players
Wrexham A.F.C. players
Mossley A.F.C. players
Hibernian F.C. players
Altrincham F.C. players
English Football League players
Scottish Football League players
Footballers from Dumfries and Galloway